Lake Brantley High School (LBHS) is located in Altamonte Springs, Florida, a suburban community approximately 13 miles (20 km) north of Orlando. It is a public high school serving grade levels 9–12 in Seminole County, FL, operated by Seminole County Public Schools. The school, which opened in 1972, is ranked 79th on Newsweek magazine's 2005 list of the top 100 high schools in the United States and 424th in the 2009 Newsweek list.

Academics
 Offers 27 Advanced Placement courses in a wide variety of academic subjects as well as in elective interests
 Received an "A" rating from the Florida Department of Education in 2006
 Had 7 National Merit Scholar finalists in the class of 2006 and had 2 in 2007

 Highest ACT and SAT scores within the district for 2002 and significantly higher than the state average
 Over 2008 AP tests administered in 2017.
 1,212 students scored 3 or higher on the 2017 AP tests
 In the class of 2017, there were 22 AP National Scholars, 76 Scholars w/Distinction, 45 Scholars w/Honors, 129 AP Scholars.

Notable people

Notes and references

External links
Lake Brantley High School athletics department

Seminole County Public Schools
Educational institutions established in 1972
High schools in Seminole County, Florida
Public high schools in Florida
1972 establishments in Florida